Da-Hung Cheng (formerly known as Chih-Hsiung Cheng (鄭志雄)) (born 12 January 1981) is a Taiwanese baseball player who is currently a free agent in the Chinese Professional Baseball League.

He represented Taiwan at the 1999 World Junior Baseball Championship, 2001 World Port Tournament, 2002 World University Baseball Championship, 2013 World Baseball Classic and 2017 World Baseball Classic.

References 

1981 births
Living people
Baseball catchers
Brother Elephants players
EDA Rhinos players
People from Taitung County
Sinon Bulls players
Taiwanese baseball players
2013 World Baseball Classic players
2017 World Baseball Classic players